University of Connecticut School of Dental Medicine is a school of dentistry located at the UConn Health Center in Farmington, Connecticut, United States. The school is often placed highly in national rankings, and was ranked #1 by the National Board Dental Examiners in 2001 based on the board scores of students. During the 2013-2014 application year, approximately 1,300 applications were received. Of these, 160 were interviewed and offers were eventually made to approximately 80, for an acceptance rate of around 6%.

Departments
University of Connecticut School of Dental Medicine includes the following departments:
Department of Oral Health and Diagnostic Sciences
Department of Reconstructive Sciences
Department of Craniofacial Sciences
Department of Craniofacial Sciences include the divisions of Oral and Maxillofacial Surgery, Pediatric Dentistry, Advanced Education in General Dentistry, and Orthodontics.

Accreditation
University of Connecticut School of Dental Medicine is currently accredited by the ADA.

See also
University of Connecticut Department of Periodontology

References

Dental schools in Connecticut
Educational institutions established in 1968
Dental Medicine